Ahmad Awais  (Urdu: احمد اویس) is a senior Advocate Supreme Court of Pakistan, who also served as Advocate General Punjab
2018–2019, in the PTI Government 2018,  he remained the President of Lahore High Court Bar Association, Lahore 2004. He is senior member of PTI (Pakistan Tehrik Insaaf) and brother in law of General Hamid Gul who remained Chief of ISI. In his election campaign when he was contesting Bar election of High Court Bar Association he claimed that he will conduct criminal trial,  in the Bar,  of the dictator General Pervez Musharraf. His sons and son in law,  are also advocates and member of the Bar Association.

Awais has been appointed Advocate General Punjab for the second time on 29.07.2020.

Professional  life 
He is senior Advocate Supreme Court of Pakistan, his family has number of Lawyers including his son and  son in law,  Usman Arif who is presently serving as Deputy Attorney General for Pakistan. He remained President of Lahore High Court Bar Association for the term 2004–5.

Advocate General Punjab 
He was appointed Advocate General Punjab 2018 to represent the cases of Punjab Government before Supreme Court of Pakistan and Lahore High Court. During the case of Model Town riot in which 14 person were brutally killed and hundreds were injured and a high power JIT was constituted to investigate the matter and a Full Bench of Lahore High Court rejected plea taken by Advocate General Punjab on which some derogatory and harsh words were exchanged during the arguments, on which a Contempt Notice was issued to the Advocate General then he resigned from the Post of Advocate General Punjab

In March 2020, he was again appointed Advocate General Punjab.

See also
 Supreme Court Bar Association of Pakistan
 Lahore High Court Bar Association 
 Advocate General Punjab

References

Living people
Pakistani democracy activists
Lawyers from Lahore
Pakistan Tehreek-e-Insaf politicians
Year of birth missing (living people)
People from Lahore